I Fall in Love Too Easily is the fifth studio album by American actress, singer and songwriter Katharine McPhee. It was released on November 17, 2017 via BMG. The record was produced by Don Was, and features covers of romantic American standards. It was made available for pre-order on October 5, 2017.

Background 
In September 2016, McPhee announced that her next studio album was going to feature classic American standards under the supervision of Don Was. When asked about the project, McPhee shared: "They are songs I am inspired by. I've been inspired by them for a long time, these old standards, I've been singing since I was a little kid."

Recording and inspiration 
In December 2015, McPhee took part in a CBS special to celebrate Frank Sinatra’s 100th birthday - Sinatra 100: An All-Star Grammy Concert. McPhee and John Legend performed the opening medley of Sinatra's "You Make Me Feel So Young," "My Kind Of Town," and "You And Me (We Wanted It All)". Backstage, she met Don Was and discussed working with him on a project of music similar to what was performed that night. Was assembled a band for them to perform a few concerts at bars in California before heading into the studio together.

She recorded the album in the Capitol Records Building in a studio that included equipment used by Sinatra on his recordings.

Title 
On October 5, 2017 in an Instagram and Facebook live, Katharine revealed that her album would be titled I Fall in Love Too Easily, and explained that it had been suggested by producer Don Was. She later admitted that I Fall in Love Too Easily was a fitting title because, "...it's the truth."

Singles 
The first single, "Night and Day" was made available for free via SoundCloud, and premiered on Entertainment Weekly's website; it was later added to other streaming sites, and made available for purchase on iTunes. The track was also released as an instant download with the pre-order of the album on iTunes, and amazon.

Track listing 

– Sources:

Charts

References 

2017 albums
Katharine McPhee albums